Nonischnoscia is a genus of moths belonging to the family Tineidae. It contains only one species, Nonischnoscia umbraticostella, which is found in the West Indies.

References

Tineidae
Monotypic moth genera
Moths of the Caribbean
Tineidae genera